Xiomara Rivero Azcuy (born 24 December 1968 in Guane, Pinar del Río) is a retired track and field athlete from Cuba, who competed in the javelin throw. Her personal best throw is 65.29 metres from March 2001.

International competitions

References

Actualmente es entrenadora del equipo nacional minusválido cubano

1968 births
Living people
People from Pinar del Río Province
Cuban female javelin throwers
Olympic athletes of Cuba
Athletes (track and field) at the 1996 Summer Olympics
Athletes (track and field) at the 2000 Summer Olympics
Pan American Games medalists in athletics (track and field)
Pan American Games gold medalists for Cuba
Pan American Games silver medalists for Cuba
Athletes (track and field) at the 1995 Pan American Games
Athletes (track and field) at the 1999 Pan American Games
World Athletics Championships athletes for Cuba
Central American and Caribbean Games silver medalists for Cuba
Competitors at the 1993 Central American and Caribbean Games
Central American and Caribbean Games medalists in athletics
Medalists at the 1995 Pan American Games
Medalists at the 1999 Pan American Games
World Athletics U20 Championships winners
20th-century Cuban women
21st-century Cuban women